The statue of Miguel Hidalgo y Costilla may refer to:

 Statue of Miguel Hidalgo y Costilla, Cholula, Puebla, Mexico
 Statue of Miguel Hidalgo y Costilla, Guadalajara, Jalisco, Mexico